Kuzu (literally "lamb") is a Turkish surname from a nickname and may refer to:
 Abdurrahim Kuzu (born 1955), Turkish and American former wrestler
 Atilla Kuzu (born 1963), Turkish interior designer and furniture designer
 Burhan Kuzu (1955–2020), Turkish academic and politician
 Tunahan Kuzu (born 1981), Turkish-born Dutch politician

See also 
 Kuzu (disambiguation)

References 

Surnames from nicknames
Turkish-language surnames